Born is an EP released by D'espairsRay on April 28, 2004. The CD was re-released, excluding the DVD on July 21, 2004 because the album had sold out within a small amount of time.

Track listing
Disc One

Disc Two (DVD, first pressing only)
 "Gärnet" - 4:24

"Marry of the Blood" features violin by Sugizo.
Track 83 is a hidden track. It features an acoustic version of Yami ni Furu Kiseki's chorus.
The lyrics to "Marry of the Blood" are printed entirely in English in the booklet, although only parts of the song are in English.
The songs "Marry of the Blood" and "Yami ni Furu Kiseki" are re-recordings of the same songs on the Maverick single.
The song "Murder Freaks" is a re-recording of the same song on the Terrors EP.
The songs "Born" and "Marry of the Blood" were remixed for the Coll:set album, and "Yami ni Furu Kiseki" was remixed for the Horizon single.
In the lyrics credits for the songs, Hizumi's name is misprinted as 'Hizmi' within the booklet.

2004 EPs
D'espairsRay EPs